The Bay Area Ridge Trail (Ridge Trail) is a planned  multi-use trail along the hill and mountain ridgelines ringing the San Francisco Bay Area, in Northern California. Currently,  have been established. When complete, the trail will connect over 75 parks and open spaces. The trail is being designed to provide access for hikers, runners, mountain bicyclists, and equestrians. It will be accessible through trailheads near major population centers, while the trail will extend into more remote areas. The first trail section was dedicated on May 13, 1989.

History
William Penn Mott Jr., the twelfth director of the National Park Service, is credited with sparking the idea for the Ridge Trail in a speech he gave in March 1987 at a state parks and recreation conference. While working for the East Bay Regional Park District in the 1960s, Mott's office was on a ridgeline in the East Bay, and the views from the office inspired his vision of a hill-and-ridge trail encircling the Bay and linking its communities. The plan would later attract bipartisan support, with George Miller joining Mott.

In May 1987, the Greenbelt Alliance held a meeting to strategize how to approach the San Francisco Water Department and convince them to open their watershed lands to the public; Mark Evanoff convened the meeting and Brian O'Neill, Superintendent of the Golden Gate National Recreation Area, proposed a potential strategy to pursue the goals outlined in the report by the President's Commission on Americans Outdoors. Later that year, a planning committee was formed with membership from nearly 40 public agency, recreation groups, and individuals. Eventually, this committee became the Bay Area Ridge Trail Council.

Dinesh Desai, a retired engineer, and Bob Cowell, a retired fire chief, completed the first hike of the Ridge Trail in 1999, despite its incomplete status. The pair followed existing trails and planned alignment where no trails existed, including a crossing of the Carquinez Strait by kayak.

Trail progress

The first two segments of the trail, on lands in San Mateo County managed by the Midpeninsula Regional Open Space District and the San Mateo County Department of Parks, were dedicated on May 13, 1989. Other counties quickly followed suit, with Marin County and San Francisco City and County opening their first segments in September 1989; Napa, Solano, and Santa Clara counties in October 1989; Contra Costa and Alameda counties in June 1990; and Sonoma County in October 1990.

By 1999,  of the Ridge Trail had been completed, mainly on public lands.  of the Ridge Trail were added in 2005, including a new bridge over San Geronimo Creek; at that point the Ridge Trail had completed . The section of Ridge Trail through Crockett Hills Regional Park in Contra Costa County, which opened in June 2006, pushed the trail past the  mark.

, the Ridge Trail stands at  completed. The section of the trail that runs through San Francisco has been completed, and parts of the SF trail have been rerouted to pass through more green space and over Twin Peaks. Large sections of the trail through San Mateo, Marin, Contra Costa and Alameda counties have been completed. Much of the remaining mileage is on private property in Santa Clara, Sonoma, and Napa, and may require land acquisition and/or easements to expand the trail across these properties.

Route

Starting at the Golden Gate Bridge and proceeding clockwise, the current and planned alignment of the Ridge Trail takes it through every Bay Area county: Marin, Sonoma, Napa, Solano, Contra Costa, Alameda, Santa Clara, Santa Cruz, San Mateo, and San Francisco counties. The planned alignment of the Ridge Trail extends as far north as Calistoga and Angwin, and as far south as Gilroy.

San Francisco City and County
From south to north, the trail passes through:
 Lake Merced
 Stern Grove
 Twin Peaks
 Buena Vista Park
 The panhandle of Golden Gate Park
 The Presidio

Bay Area Ridge Trail Council
The Bay Area Ridge Trail Council (BARTC), founded in 1987, is the organization working on the Ridge Trail. BARTC initially was supported by the Greenbelt Alliance, but incorporated in 1991 as a 501(c)(3) nonprofit under co-chairs Brian O'Neill and Marcia McNally. They partner with governments, nonprofit land trusts, and volunteer organizations in all nine Bay Area counties to help protect and preserve open space and plan, construct, and promote the Ridge Trail.  The Council office is in The Presidio, San Francisco.

See also

San Francisco Bay Trail
Bay Area Ridge Trail on OpenStreetMap

References

Bibliography

External links 

Bay Area Ridge Trail Council

 
Hiking trails in California
Trails in the San Francisco Bay Area
Mountain biking venues in the United States
Protected areas of Santa Clara County, California
Protected areas of San Mateo County, California
Protected areas of Marin County, California
Protected areas of Contra Costa County, California
Protected areas of Alameda County, California
Transportation in Contra Costa County, California
Transportation in Marin County, California
Transportation in San Francisco
Transportation in Santa Clara County, California
Transportation in Alameda County, California
Transportation in Solano County, California
Transportation in Napa County, California
Transportation in Sonoma County, California
Transportation in San Mateo County, California
Tourist attractions in the San Francisco Bay Area